Almuth Lütkenhaus (née Wirsing; 8 March 1930 in Hamm, Westphalia – 1996 in Ottawa, Ontario) was a sculptor, also known as Almuth Lütkenhaus-Lackey. From 1948 until 1952 she studied art at schools in Dortmund and Münster. She married Erich Lütkenhaus, an artist, in 1952, from whom she later separated. She lived in Soest from 1962 until 1966, when she moved to Canada, where she died in 1996.

References
Clague, Julie. "Symbolism and the Power of Art: Female Representations of Christ Crucified."  Bodies in Question: Gender, Religion, Text. Yvonne Sherwood and Darlene Bird, eds. Ashgate Publishing, Ltd., 2005. 34–37. 
Clague, Julie. "The Christa: Symbolizing My Humanity and My Pain." Feminist Theology, Vol. 14, No. 1 (2005):  83–108.
Clague, Julie. "Divine Transgressions: The Female Christ-form in Art." Critical Quarterly 47 (2005): 47–63.
Dyke, Doris Jean. "Crucified Woman: Art and the Experience of Faith." Toronto Journal of Theology 5 (Fall 1989): 161–169.
Dyke, Doris Jean. Crucified Woman. Toronto: United Church Publishing House, 1991. 
Elliott, Clifford. "Crucified Woman (A Sculpture)." International Review of Mission 71 (July 1982): 332–335.
Lütkenhaus, Almuth. Almuth Lütkenhaus: Sculptures, Retrospective 1966-74. Essay by Pat Fleisher. Ottawa: National Arts Centre, 1974.

External links
Toronto Sculpture database

Gallery

1930 births
1996 deaths
People from Hamm
Canadian sculptors
German sculptors
German women sculptors
German emigrants to Canada
20th-century sculptors
20th-century German women artists